Dmitry Balmin (born July 15, 1970) is a retired Russian ice hockey defender. He played 16 seasons in Ak Bars (Itil, SK imeni Uritskovo). He played nearly 900 games for Tatarstanian teams.

Balmin was Russian champion in 1998. He also plays for HC Neftekhimik Nizhnekamsk.

Career statistics

External links

1970 births
Ak Bars Kazan players
HC Neftekhimik Nizhnekamsk players
Living people
Russian ice hockey defencemen
Soviet ice hockey defencemen